Frederick Donald Rudolph (August 16, 1931 – September 12, 1968) was an American Major League Baseball (MLB) left-handed pitcher. He appeared in 124 games pitched over all or parts of six major league seasons for the Chicago White Sox, Cincinnati Reds, Cleveland Indians and Washington Senators between 1957 and 1964.

Rudolph's professional baseball career extended from 1950 through 1966, except for the 1953 season, which he spent in the United States Army. Of his 124 MLB appearances, 57 were starts. He compiled an 18–32 record (.360), with ten complete games and two shutouts. The two whitewashings came in back-to-back starts for Washington during ; he defeated the Minnesota Twins and Baltimore Orioles on August 23 and 28, respectively. In 450 MLB innings pitched, he allowed 485 hits and 102 bases on balls, striking out 182 hitters. His career ERA was 4.00. He was credited with three saves.

Known during his career as the husband and manager of burlesque dancer "Patti Waggin" (born Patricia Brownell), Rudolph was a batting practice pitcher for the American League (AL) All-Star team on July 10, 1962 at District of Columbia Stadium (Robert F. Kennedy Stadium). In 1963, he pitched in 37 games for Washington and led the AL in fielding percentage as a pitcher with a 1.000 fielding average. He also was the starting pitcher for Washington's traditional "Presidential Opener" on April 8 that season. After John F. Kennedy threw out the ceremonial first pitch, Rudolph went five innings against the Baltimore Orioles, allowing home runs to left-handed hitters Jim Gentile and Boog Powell and taking the 3–1 loss.

Rudolph owned a construction business when he was killed in a truck accident at age 37.

References

External links

1931 births
1968 deaths
Baseball players from Baltimore
Buffalo Bisons (minor league) players
Burials at Forest Lawn Memorial Park (Hollywood Hills)
Chicago White Sox players
Cincinnati Reds players
Cleveland Indians players
Colorado Springs Sky Sox (WL) players
Havana Sugar Kings players
Indianapolis Indians players
Louisville Colonels (minor league) players
Major League Baseball pitchers
Memphis Chickasaws players
Road incident deaths in California
San Diego Padres (minor league) players
Seattle Rainiers players
Toronto Maple Leafs (International League) players
Washington Senators (1961–1971) players
Jesup Bees players
Truck road incident deaths
American expatriate baseball players in Cuba